Salpichroa is a genus of flowering plants belonging to the family Solanaceae.

Its native range is Western and Southern South America to Southern Brazil.

Species
Species:

Salpichroa dependens 
Salpichroa diffusa 
Salpichroa gayi 
Salpichroa glandulosa 
Salpichroa hirsuta 
Salpichroa leucantha 
Salpichroa micrantha 
Salpichroa microloba 
Salpichroa microphylla 
Salpichroa origanifolia 
Salpichroa proboscidea 
Salpichroa ramosissima 
Salpichroa salpoensis 
Salpichroa scandens 
Salpichroa tristis 
Salpichroa weberbaueri 
Salpichroa weigendii

References

Solanaceae
Solanaceae genera